The National Front for Liberation (Al-Jabhat al-Wataniya lil-Tahrir) is a Syrian rebel coalition that is part of the Syrian National Army (SNA) fighting in the Syrian Civil War. The group was formed by 11 rebel factions in northwestern Syria in May 2018, and was officially announced on 28 May 2018. The formation receives major support from Turkey. The group joined the SNA on 4 October 2019.

Commanders
From 28 May to 1 August 2018, Colonel Fadlallah al-Haji of the Sham Legion was the group's overall commander, Lieutenant Colonel Suhaib Leoush of the Free Idlib Army was its deputy commander, and Major Muhammad Mansour of the Army of Victory was its chief of staff. 

On 1 August, Ahmad Sarhan ("Abu Satif") of the Suqour al-Sham Brigades and Walid al-Mushayil ("Abu Hashim") of Jaysh al-Ahrar were named as the group's new first and second deputy commanders, respectively, while Walid al-Mushayil ("Abu Hashim") of Ahrar al-Sham was appointed chief of staff.

History

2018
On 4 June 2018, the Martyrs of Islam Brigade, part of the National Front for Liberation, joined the Sham Legion, also part of the NFL.

On 1 August, the Syrian Liberation Front, which was formed by Ahrar al-Sham and the Nour al-Din al-Zenki Movement in February 2018, as well as Jaysh al-Ahrar and the Damascus Gathering, joined the formation. 

On 5 August, the NFL arrested 45 people accused of attempting to reconcile with the Syrian government in al-Ghab Plain and Mount Shashabo in the western Hama countryside. On 13 August, the crackdown campaign was expanded to Maarat al-Nu'man and Ariha.

On 9 August, the NFL's Sham Legion launched an attack on a People's Protection Units (YPG) cell in the southeastern Afrin countryside, killing four YPG fighters and capturing small arms and ammunition.

On 14 August, the group released a video showing the training of its self-proclaimed "Unit 82 SWAT Forces". On the same day, a group of around 200 fighters formed the Free Hayan Brigade and joined the NFL in order to "unite factions", "fight forces of the Syrian regime", and avoid rebel infighting. The next day, the Free North Brigade, which operates around the same area, also joined the NFL. On 27 August, the Imam Ali Battalion joined the Free North Brigade.

2019
In January 2019, following defeat at the hands of Hayat Tahrir al-Sham, Nour al-Zenki left Idlib for the north, leaving the NFL.

On 26 March 2019, the National Front for Liberation released a statement declaring its rejection and condemnation of the United States recognition of the Golan Heights as part of Israel.

During the Syrian military’s Northwestern Syria offensive (April 2019–present) against rebel-held territory, the NFL cooperated with Hayat Tahrir al-Sham (HTS) in the battle over Kfar Nabuda in Idlib, May 2019. It also cooperated with the Army of Glory, and other rebel groups to counter the offensive.

It merged with the SNA in October 2019. According to Middle East Eye, neither the NFL nor SNA fighters had been informed of the merger, which was announced at a press conference in Urfa, southern Turkey.

On 9 October 2019, 500 fighters from the Army of Glory, including its deputy commander-in-chief Captain Manaf Maarati and spokesman Captain Mustafa Maarati, reportedly defected to the NFL.

2020
On 15 March 2020, Step News Agency reported that Fadlallah al-Haji had resigned from his position on the orders of the Turkish government. The move came after the discovery of a large-scale embezzlement involving the Sham Legion and other groups within the NFL who misrepresented the amount of fighters within their ranks in order to receive extra salaries from their Turkish ally. Turkey requested the NFL to prepare between 2,000 and 3,000 fighters to prepare for a Turkish Armed Forces-led military offensive against the Syrian Armed Forces in the western Aleppo Governorate in the event of the Russia–Turkey ceasefire breaking down, but the NFL only equipped 350 fighters after submitting 14,000 fake names to Turkey. However, Enab Baladi contacted Captain Naji Mustafa, who denied that al-Haji had resigned, and al-Haji continues to serve as the commander-in-chief of the NFL.

Member groups

Sham Legion
Martyrs of Islam Brigade
Central Division
Free Idlib Army
1st Coastal Division
2nd Army
2nd Coastal Division
Elite Army
1st Infantry Division
Army of Victory
23rd Division
Islamic Freedom Brigade
Ahrar al-Sham
Suqour al-Sham Brigades
Jaysh al-Ahrar
Damascus Gathering
Hamza ibn Abdul Muttalib Battalions
Brigades and Battalions to Unite the Capital
Miqdad ibn Amr Brigade
Unit 82 SWAT Forces
Free Hayan Brigade
Free North Brigade

Former groups 

 Nour al-Din al-Zenki Movement

See also
5th Corps (Syrian rebel group)
Syrian Front for Liberation
Syrian Revolutionary Command Council
Syrian Islamic Liberation Front
National Front for Liberation–Tahrir al-Sham conflict

References

Free Syrian Army
Anti-government factions of the Syrian civil war
Anti-ISIL factions in Syria